William Sayer (22 Jun 1934 – 16 Aug 1989), also known by the nickname of 'Sos', was an English professional rugby league footballer who played in the 1950s, 1960s and 1970s.

Background
Bill Sayer's birth was registered in Wigan, Lancashire, and his death aged 55 was registered in Wigan, Greater Manchester, England.

Playing career

International honours
Bill Sayer won 7-caps for Great Britain while at Wigan in 1961 against New Zealand, in 1962 against France, Australia (3 matches), and New Zealand, and in 1963 against Australia.

Career at Wigan
One of the finest hookers in the game, Bill Sayer enjoyed two long careers, one with Wigan and one with St Helens. He joined Wigan from Wigan Highfield in 1954 after being invited to play in three trial games – He was signed after just two. As well as showing early promise at Rugby League, Sayer was a useful Boxer and Soccer player. He made his Wigan début at Halifax on 4 December 1954 but had to wait until the latter part of 1956–7 for a regular place when he replaced Mather in the number nine shirt. For the next seven years, until changed by Colin Clarke, the shirt was virtually his own property. Bill Sayer played  in Wigan's 13–9 victory over Workington Town in the 1958 Challenge Cup Final during the 1957–58 season at Wembley Stadium, London on Saturday 10 May 1958, in front of a crowd of 66,109, and played  in the 30–13 victory over Hull F.C. in the 1959 Challenge Cup Final during the 1958–59 season at Wembley Stadium, London on Saturday 9 May 1959, in front of a crowd of 79,811. Sayer's confrontation with Hull's Tommy Harris was much awaited. Each set of fans hailed their hooker as the best in the business. Sayer proved the best on the day as he won possession two-to-one, just as he had done at Wembley 12-months earlier. He scored a try in the Championship win over Wakefield in 1960 but two more Wembley appearances resulted in loser medals. A Lancashire County player, he won the first of his seven Great Britain caps against New Zealand at Leeds in September 1961. The following year he went on the Australian tour.

Career at St. Helens
In 1965 he started his second career with St Helens. He added to his club honours by collecting two Championship, and a third Challenge Cup-winners medal. The latter was particularly sweet for Sayer as it was in the 1966 win over Wigan. His last honour, 12 years after his first, was in the 1970 Championship over Leeds.

Championship final appearances
Bill Sayer played  in St. Helens' 35–12 victory over Halifax in the Championship Final during the 1965–66 season at Station Road, Swinton on Saturday 28 May 1966, in front of a crowd of 30,165.

Challenge Cup Final appearances
Bill Sayer played  in St. Helens' 21–2 victory over Wigan in the 1966 Challenge Cup Final during the 1965–66 season at Wembley Stadium, London on Saturday 21 May 1966, in front of a crowd of 98,536.

County Cup Final appearances
Bill Sayer played  in Wigan' 8–13 defeat by Oldham in the 1957 Lancashire County Cup Final during the 1957–58 season at Station Road, Swinton on Saturday 19 October 1957, played  in St. Helens 2–2 draw with Warrington in the 1967 Lancashire County Cup Final during the 1967–68 season at Central Park, Wigan on Saturday 7 October 1967, played  in the 13–10 victory over Warrington in the 1967 Lancashire County Cup Final replay during the 1967–68 season at Station Road, Swinton on Saturday 2 December 1967, and played  in the 30–2 victory over Oldham in the 1968 Lancashire County Cup Final during the 1968–69 season at Central Park, Wigan on Friday 25 October 1968.

BBC2 Floodlit Trophy Final appearances
Bill Sayer played  in St. Helens' 4–7 defeat by Wigan in the 1968–69 BBC2 Floodlit Trophy Final at Central Park, Wigan on Tuesday 17 December 1968.

References

External links
!Great Britain Statistics at englandrl.co.uk (statistics currently missing due to not having appeared for both Great Britain, and England)
Statistics at wigan.rlfans.com
Profile at saints.org.uk

1934 births
1989 deaths
English rugby league players
Great Britain national rugby league team players
Lancashire rugby league team players
Liverpool City (rugby league) players
Rugby league players from Wigan
Rugby league hookers
St Helens R.F.C. players
Wigan Warriors players